Return Of Mak Million is the 2003 album by Haystak, recorded on Street Flava.

Return of the Mak Million
 "First Song" - 3:07
 "Tote Me 2 Tha Hole" - 3:47
 "Monster" - 4:44
 "Big Boy Shit" - 4:45
 "All Alone" - 3:46
 "Crushed Pillow Seats" - 5:19
 "Come On" - 4:26
 "Round and Round" - 3:33
 "Keep Tha Light On" - 4:18
 "Flamboyant" - 3:04
 "Back The Fuck Up Off Me" - 3:34
 "I" - 4:09
 "Way's Gonna Be" - 4:01
 "I Fo Tha Players" - 4:10

Haystak albums
2003 albums